Modelski (feminine: Modelska) is a Polish surname. Notable people include:

 Filip Modelski, Polish footballer
 George Modelski, Polish-American political scientist
 Izydor Modelski, Polish military officer and spy
 Witold Modelski, Polish resistance fighter

Polish-language surnames